Taliparamba (also known as Perinchelloor and Lakshmipuram) is a Municipality in Taliparamba taluk of Kannur district, Kerala, India.

Etymology
The town's name may be derived from "Tali" (plate) and "Parambu" (area or ground), and from the legend of Rajarajeshwara Temple. According to this legend, the Ikshvaku King Maandhatha offered great penance to Shiva who in return gifted him with a Shiva Linga and instructed him to place it at a site where there had never been a cremation ground. He found a space the size of a plate in Perinchelloor, and hence the name Taliparamba became attached to the area. Lakshmipuram, a previous name for the city, means place of prosperity.

History
Taliparamba was one of the traditional establishments in ancient Kerala. It is located in erstwhile Kolathunadu, which was ruled over by the Mushika/Kolathiri/Chirakkal Royal Family. It was also once a part of the Mannanar dynasty. As per tradition, Taliparamba originated as the Perinchalloor Brahmin settlement. Of the 2,000 Brahmin families who settled here, only 45 remain today, In 1955 the Taliparamba panchayat was formed, with Balakrishna Menon as its first president. In 1975 the Pattuvam region was separated from the panchayat. In 1990 Taliparamba Municipality was formed by merging Anthoor and Taliparamba panchayats and then bifurcated Anthoor region from Taliparamba to create separate Anthoor Municipality in 2015.

Location

Administration

Taliparamba is the headquarters of Taliparamba taluk, one of the five taluks constituting the district and one of the revenue divisions in Kerala.

Taliparamba Revenue Division
Kannur district is divided into two revenue divisions, Taliparamba Revenue Division in the north and Thalassery Revenue Division in the south, respectively. Taliparamba revenue division has jurisdiction over taluks of Payyanur, Taliparamba and Kannur.

Taliparamba Assembly constituency is part of the Kannur Lok Sabha constituency.

Taliparamba Municipality
Taliparamba Municipality has total administration over 8,909 houses to which it supplies basic amenities like water and sewerage. It is also authorize to build roads within Municipality limits and impose taxes on properties coming under its jurisdiction.

Geography
The surrounding area (including the villages of Pattuvam, Pariyaram, Kuttiyeri, Karimbam, and Koonam) features lush green fields and low rolling hills. The Kuppam and Valapattanam rivers surround the town and the Arabian Sea is only  to the west of the city.

Education

In the 14th and 15th centuries, during the regime of the Kolathiri Rajas, Taliparamba was renowned in Kerala as a seat of learning, enlightenment, and culture. Today, the most prominent educational institutions include:

Colleges
 Pariyaram Medical College
 Government College of Engineering, Kannur
 National Institute of Fashion Technology Kannur
 Sir Syed College (Taliparamba)
 Taliparamba Arts and Science College
 National College, Taliparamba
 MM Knowledge Arts and Science College, Taliparamba
 Keyi Sahib Training College, Taliparamba
 Al Maquar Arabic college, Taliparamba 
 College of Applied Science, Pattuvam
 Morazha Co-operative Arts & Science College
 Aerosis College of Aviation and Management Studies, Karakkund

Schools
 Tagore Vidyaniketan, Taliparamba
 Moothedath Higher Secondary School, Taliparamba
 Sir Syed Higher Secondary School, Karimbam
 Seethi Sahib Higher Secondary School
 St. Paul's High School, Taliparamba
 Chinmaya Vidyalaya, Taliparamba
 Bharatiya Vidya Bhavan, Taliparamba
 Yatheem Khana UP School, Manna
 Trichambaram U.P.School
 Akkiparamba UP School, Chiravakk
 Shyam Prasad School, Taliparamba

Demographics

In 2015, Anthoor region was carved from Taliparamba Municipality and formed a separate Anthoor Municipality. The female sex ratio here is of 1187 against state average of 1084.

Literacy rate of Taliparamba town is 96% higher than state average of 94.00%. In Taliparamba, male literacy is around 97.50% while female literacy rate is 93.06%.

Kinfra Textile Park
Kinfra Textile Park Taliparamba located in Nadukani near Taliparamba established in 2010 by Kinfra spread over 50.18 hectares is the hub of textile manufacturing activities in Kannur district. A textile dyeing and printing centre also is being facilitated in Nadukani Kinfra Apparel Park.

Politics
The political landscape of Taliparamba Assembly is dominated by the CPI(M). The current MLA of Taliparamba is M.V. Govindan, the present state secretary of CPI(M) who won by a margin of 22,689 votes in the 2021 Kerala Legislative Assembly election.

Taliparamba municipality has strong presence of IUML, CPI(M) along with nominal presence of INC and BJP. Taliparamba municipality is currently ruled by UDF allied IUML.

Taliparamba Municipality Election 2020

Law and order
The municipality comes under jurisdiction of Taliparamba police station which was formed on 30th May 1931. This police station comprises within 8 villages, i.e. Taliparamba, Pattuvam, Anthoor, Morazha, Kooveri, Kuttiyeri, Panniyoor and Kurumathur.

Taliparamba is also a headquarters of Taliparamba sub division under Kannur rural police district which is formed on 01.08.1986. It is situated 400m east of NH 66. The sub division has jurisdiction control over five police stations viz. Taliparamba, Alakode, Kudianmala, Sreekandapuram and Payyavoor.

Court Complexes in Taliparamba

 Judicial First Class Majistrate Court, Taliparamba
 Munsiff Court, Taliparamba
 Motor Accident Claims Tribunal, Taliparamba

Transportation
The National Highway (NH 66) passes through Taliparamba Town. Goa and Mumbai can be accessed on the northern side and Cochin and Thiruvananthapuram can be accessed on the southern side. National Highway 66 is given node for construction of 6 lane on different stretches of Kerala including Taliparamba-Muzhappilangad and Nileshwar-Taliparamba stretches.    SH 36 connects Taliparamba town with Sreekandapuram, Irikkur, Iritty and Mysore and Bangalore are accessible from Iritty towards east.

Taliparamba has several private and KSRTC buses plying places inside and outside the Kannur district. Taliparamba is well-connected to its suburbs through several bus services. Taliparamba town has two bus terminals - Taliparamba Municipal Bus Stand on NH-66 road and Kakkathodu Bus Stand on SH-36 road.

A road is being proposed to develop from Taliparamba to Kannur Airport which passes through Mayyil, Kololam, Chalode areas. Once it is materialised, distance from Kannur Airport to Payyanur, Kanhangad and other such places north of Taliparamba will be reduced and benefited. Mangalore and Calicut are the other Airports nearby.

Tourism
Vismaya, an amusement water theme park situated nearby Taliparamba. The bridges at Kuttiyeri and Kooveri, Vellikkeel Eco-Tourism Park, and the riverside temple at Parassinikkadavu attract many tourists. Paithal Mala and Palakkayam thattu hill stations are the other popular tourist spots nearby.

Gallery

Religions
Taliparamba is home to a number of temples, churches, and mosques. Temples include the Rajarajeshwara Temple, Trichambaram Temple and Parassinikkadavu Temple. Taliparamba Juma Masjid and St. Mary's Church are other prominent religious centres in the town.

Rajarajeshwara Temple

Rajarajeshwara Temple is one of the 108 existing ancient Shiva Temples in Kerala. The temple is about 2 kilometres from Taliparamba town. Rajarajeswara Temple doesn't allow women to worship from inside the enclosure around the sanctum sanctorum during daytime.
The temple even draws visitors from the neighboring states of Karnataka and Tamil Nadu. Karnataka former Chief Minister Yeddyurappa visited here many times. 
Tamil Nadu former Chief Minister Jayalalitha shared special relation with the temple.

Trichambaram Temple

The Trichambaram Temple is about 3 kilometres south of Taliparamba. The famous two-week Trichambaram festival is celebrated every year at this temple. On the final day of the festival, the scene of Balarama bidding farewell to his brother Krishna is enacted.

Kanjirangad Vaidyanatha Temple
Kanjirangad Vaidyanadtha Temple is the third important temple in Taliparamba, dedicated to the worship of Shiva. The three temples are together overseen by the Malabar Devaswom Board.

Taliparamba Juma masjid

The Taliparamba Valiya Juma masjid is inside the city's market. The city's main burial ground is near the masjid. The mosque's architecture features traditional Vasthu elements, while the interior demonstrates regal as well as traditional themes. The main hall, used mostly for Friday sermons, is built of wood and features large load-bearing pillars.

St. Mary’s Forane Pilgrim church
Since the early 1960’s, Syrian Catholics from Northern Travancore began to settle at Taliparamba for various purpose like education, employment and mercantile. Then  Trichambaram St Paul’s Church and Pushpagiri CMI Church were there for their religious purposes. On Dec 25 1990, St Mary’s Parish took birth under the Archdiocese of Tellicherry and laid foundation stone on 2008 August 15. On April 14, 2012 the church was inaugurated and opened for the public under the presidency of former Bishop Mar George Valyamattam. On 2013 March 17, the church was decalred as a forane church and a pilgrimage centre.

Pushpagiri church
The church at Pushpagiri hills is Catholic.

Mosques
The city's mosques include Taliparamba Juma masjid, Syed Nagar mosque, Shadulipalli Market Road mosque, Yatheem Khana masjid, and Rifai Juma masjid.

Karimbam farm
The District Agricultural Farm at Karimbam is a major research organization in Taliparamba. The farm was originally established in 1905 by Sir Charles Alfred Barber at the behest of the Madras Government, based on the recommendation of the Famine Commission of 1880 of the Government of India. Although the objective was to do research on pepper, the activities of the farm were further extended to agroclimatic experiments, hybridization and the production and distribution of seeds and seedlings. Covering an area of 56 hectares, the farm has a rich biodiversity with a variety of indigenous and exotic fruit trees, such as Mangosteen, Rambutan, and Durian. Kerala government has proposed to develop Karimbam farm to be a tourist spot in the state.

Notable People
 Santhosh Keezhattoor - Film Actor/Producer
 Nikhila Vimal - Film actress
 Reshmi Boban - Film actress
 Sherry Govindan - Film Director
 Athmiya Rajan - Film actress
 Ratheesh Ambat - Film Director
 Raghavan - Film Actor
 M.V. Govindan - Political leader 
 Jishnu Raghavan - Film Actor

See also
 Muyyam
 Alakkode Road
 Taliparamba West
 Dharmasala, Kannur

References

External links

 
 Map

 Cities and towns in Kannur district